The Permanent Court of Arbitration (PCA) is a non-UN intergovernmental organization located in The Hague, Netherlands. Unlike a judicial court in the traditional sense, the PCA provides services of arbitral tribunal to resolve disputes that arise out of international agreements between member states, international organizations or private parties. The cases span a range of legal issues involving territorial and maritime boundaries, sovereignty, human rights, international investment, and international and regional trade. The PCA is constituted through two separate multilateral conventions with a combined membership of 122 states. It is not a United Nations agency,
but a United Nations observer.

The PCA was created at the first Hague Peace Conference of 1899. The Peace Palace was built from 1907 to 1913 for the PCA in The Hague. In addition, the building houses The Hague Academy of International Law, Peace Palace Library and the International Court of Justice.

Organization

The PCA is not a court in the conventional understanding of that term but an administrative organization with the object of having permanent and readily available means to serve as the registry for purposes of international arbitration and other related procedures, including commissions of enquiry and conciliation.

The Administrative Council (formally the Permanent Administrative Council) is a body composed of all diplomatic representatives of Member States accredited to the Netherlands. It is presided by the Minister of Foreign Affairs of the Netherlands, who is also a member. It is responsible for "direction and control" of the International Bureau, directs the organisation's budget and reports on its activities.

The International Bureau is the Secretariat of the PCA and is headed by the Secretary-General. It provides linguistic, research, administrative support to PCA arbitration tribunals.

The judges or arbitrators that hear cases are called Members of the Court.  Each member state may appoint up to four "of known competency in questions of international law, of the highest moral reputation and disposed to accept the duties of arbitrators" for a renewable 6-year term. Members of each member state together form a "national group". Members may be selected in arbitration cases in which the PCA provides support. National Groups may propose candidates for International Court of Justice members.

The PCA sometimes gets confused with the International Court of Justice, which has its seat in the same building. The PCA is not part of the UN system, holding observer status in the UN General Assembly since 1993.

Procedure 
In the Articles 30–57 of the Hague Convention of 1899 the rules of arbitration procedure are outlined. These rules are an adapted version of pre-existing treaties among the states. They were amended in 1907, the creation of a summary procedure for simple cases being the most conspicuous change, and were relevant in the 1920s development of rules for the Court of International Justice.

The first act of parties before the PCA is the submission of the so-called "compromisis", stating the issue and the competence of the arbitrator(s). Proceedings are then conducted in two phases: written pleadings and oral discussion. The Court retires once the debate is over to deliberate and conclude the case by a simple majority of votes.

The decision is published as a writ, along with any dissenting opinions. Early Court decisions were countersigned by the arbitrators themselves, but in 1907, that responsibility was passed to the president and secretary (of the PCA). The writ is read to a public session in the presence of the agents and lawyers of the parties to the case. The decision is binding on the parties, and there is no mechanism for appeal.

Budget and fees
Between 2007 and 2008, the budget was €1.8 million.

The budget of PCA comes from the contributions of its members and income through arbitration cases. The distribution of the amounts to be paid by the individual member states is based on the system in use by the Universal Postal Union.

Parties to arbitration have to pay the expenses of the arbitral tribunal set up to hear the case, including the salary of the arbitrators, registry and administrative functions, but not including overhead of the organization. The costs of arbitration vary from case to case and discussions may be held between the PCA and the parties over fee arrangements.

The fixed costs for action as an appointing authority are €3000.

Participation

Parties to the Convention on the Pacific Settlement of disputes of 1899 (71 member states) and 1907 (101 member states) are automatically parties to the PCA. As 51 are parties to both conventions, the PCA has 122 member states: 120 members of the United Nations, as well as Kosovo and Palestine.

History
The PCA is the oldest institution for international dispute resolutions. It was established in 1899 by the first Hague Peace Conference under Articles 20 to 29 of the 1899 Hague Convention for the Pacific Settlement of International Disputes.  At the second Hague Peace Conference, the earlier Convention was revised by the 1907 Convention for the Pacific Settlement of International Disputes.  The Conference was convened at the initiative of Czar Nicholas II of Russia "with the object of seeking the most objective means of ensuring to all peoples the benefits of a real and lasting peace, and above all, of limiting the progressive development of existing armaments."

Functions
PCA tribunals have jurisdiction for disputes based on the PCA founding documents (the Conventions on Pacific Settlement of International Disputes), or based on bilateral and multilateral treaties. Its Secretary General furthermore acts as an appointing authority for arbitration.

Appointing authority
When problems arise in designating arbitrators for an arbitration under UNCITRAL arbitration rules (e.g. because one of the parties refuses to designate an arbitrator, or when the designated arbitrators are unable to agree on designation of a third arbitrator), the PCA Secretary-General may be requested to serve as an appointing authority. This option is also open for other arbitration agreements, in which the Secretary General is designated. Between 2011 and 2015, 257 of such requests were submitted.

Interstate arbitration based on the Hague Convention
Arbitration between two states takes place when two member states of the PCA decide to submit a dispute for arbitration to a PCA Tribunal. The Tribunal consists of 5 arbitrators, two of which are selected by each party to the arbitration (and one of whom may be a national of the party concerned). The four arbitrators choose the fifth and presiding arbitrator.

Interstate arbitration based on UNCLOS
The United Nations Convention on the Law of the Sea (UNCLOS) provides for a dispute resolution mechanism regarding maritime boundaries in which member states can choose either the 
International Tribunal for the Law of the Sea
International Court of Justice, 
arbitral tribunal (constituted in accordance with Annex VII, UNCLOS) 
a special arbitral tribunal (constituted in accordance with Annex VIII). 
If two member states have elected different dispute resolution measures, the third option is to be used. As of August 2016, the PCA has administered twelve of the thirteen cases initiated by states under Annex VII to the UNCLOS.

Investorstate investment disputes
Many free trade agreements provide for a mechanism to resolve disputes between investors and states through arbitration through so-called ISDS clauses. The PCA may play a role in such proceedings as appointing authority for arbitrators, by use of its arbitration rules or by providing support to the arbitration case.

Cases
Examples of cases are shown below:

Interstate
 United States of America v. Mexico (Pious Fund of the Californias) (1902)
 France v. Great Britain (Savarkar Case) (1911)
 United States of America v. The Netherlands (Island of Palmas Case) (1928)
 Eritrea v. Yemen (Hanish Islands conflict) (1999)
 Belgium v. The Netherlands (Iron Rhine case) (2005)
 Croatia v. Slovenia (2017)

Interstate: Annex VII UNCLOS
Barbados v. Trinidad and Tobago (2006)
 Bangladesh v. India (Bay of Bengal Maritime Boundary) (2014)
Mauritius v. United Kingdom (Chagos Marine Protected Area) (2015)
Philippines v. China (2016)
 Italy v. India (Enrica Lexie case) (pending)

Investor-state
Hulley Enterprises Limited (Cyprus), Yukos Universal Limited (Isle of Man) and Veteran Petroleum Limited (Cyprus) v. the Russian Federation (2015)
Cairn Energy PLC & Cairn UK Holdings Limited v. The Republic of India

Other
 United States v. Iran (Iran-United States Claims Tribunal) in the early 1980s the PCA helped set up the claims tribunal
 Eritrea v. Ethiopia (Eritrea-Ethiopia Claims Commission) (2009) Claims Commission was organized through the PCA
 Sudan v. Sudan People's Liberation Movement (Abyei Arbitration) (2009)

People, Peace and Society
The administration of justice, under prevailing international law serves to resolve disputes and preserve peace and the common good, in the interests of peoples and societies around the world.

See also
 Ligue internationale de la paix
 International arbitration
 International Court of Justice
 International Court of Arbitration

References

Further reading
 – The relevant chapter includes information about a number of cases referred to the Permanent Court of Arbitration.

External links

 PCA website
 Conventions regarding establishment of PCA
List of linked PCA cases
 Hague Justice Portal

 
Foreign direct investment
International arbitration courts and tribunals
Organisations based in The Hague
Organizations established in 1899
Intergovernmental organizations established by treaty
Hague Conventions of 1899 and 1907
Peace organizations